China–Sierra Leone relations refer to the foreign relations between China and Sierra Leone. The People's Republic of China and the Republic of Sierra Leone established diplomatic relations on July 29, 1971.

Economic ties
Economic relations between Sierra Leone and China are mostly positive.

Human rights
In June 2020, Sierra Leone was one of 53 countries that backed the Hong Kong national security law at the United Nations.

Chinese development finance to Sierra Leone
From 2000 to 2011, there are approximately 37 Chinese official development finance projects identified in Sierra Leone through various media reports. These projects range from a $22 million debt relief, to assisting in highway repair projects and constructing Charlotte Hydropower Project, and a concessional loan of US$16.6 million to support Sierratel's CDMA project.

Culture Relation 
University of Sierra Leone has a Confucius Institute.

References

 
Sierra Leone
Sierra Leone
Bilateral relations of Sierra Leone